Jonathan Wolff (born 25 June 1959) is a British philosopher and academic. He was Professor of Philosophy and Dean of the Faculty of Arts and Humanities at University College London (UCL) in 2012–16.

Life and career
Wolff was born on 25 June 1959 to Herbert Wolff and Doris Wolff (née Polakoff). He earned his Master of Philosophy from UCL under the direction of G.A. Cohen in 1985. Apart from one year as a Harkness Fellow at Harvard University, he has taught at UCL ever since. As of 1 September 2016, he holds the Blavatnik Chair in Public Policy in the Blavatnik School of Government at Oxford University.

He was formerly the secretary of the British Philosophical Association and has been Editor and then honorary secretary of the Aristotelian Society, which publishes Proceedings of the Aristotelian Society. Recently, Wolff's work has specialised in disadvantage and equality and public policy decision making.

As a scholar on the topic of Marxism, Wolff published "Marx and Exploitation", an article about Marxist thinking, in The Journal of Ethics. He also co-edited (with Michael Rosen) Political Thought, an introductionary reader on political philosophy.

He has also published a critique of Robert Nozick's Anarchy, State, and Utopia called Robert Nozick: Property, Justice and the Minimal State, a short book on Karl Marx, Why Read Marx Today?, and An Introduction to Political Philosophy. He currently writes a monthly column for The Guardian and occasionally blogs at Brian Leiter's "Leiter Reports" blog.

Jonathan Wolff presented a four-part series about the UK's National Health Service (NHS) for the BBC's Radio 3 programme 'The Essay' during the week of 27 July 2009. The series, entitled "Doctoring Philosophy", marked the 60th anniversary of the NHS and commenced by studying the philosophical background which led to the foundation of the service and the changing definitions of sickness and health. It went on to explore entitlement, issues of equality of service, and issues of priorities in a world of universal access.

He was a member of the Nuffield Council on Bioethics in 2008–2014 and served on two of the council's working parties; on the ethics of animal research, and the ethics of personalised healthcare

Bibliography 
Books

Journal articles
 
See also:

References

External links

 Wolff's website at UCL
 "Four Forms of Redistribution" by Jonathan Wolff
 "A Comment on Professor Wolff's 'Four Forms of Redistribution'" by Tony Flood'
 

1959 births
Living people
Academics of University College London
English political philosophers
Marxist theorists
Alumni of University College London
20th-century British philosophers
21st-century British philosophers
British ethicists
English male non-fiction writers
Harkness Fellows